A total of nine spacecraft have been launched on missions that involve visits to the outer planets; all nine missions involve encounters with Jupiter, with four spacecraft also visiting Saturn. One spacecraft, Voyager 2, also visited Uranus and Neptune. The nine missions include two; Ulysses and New Horizons, whose primary objectives are not related to the outer planets, but which flew past Jupiter to gain gravity assists  en route to a polar orbit around the Sun, and Pluto—at the time of its launch considered an outer planet—respectively. Cassini–Huygens also flew past Jupiter for a gravity assist on its Mission to explore Saturn.

Only three of the missions to the outer planets have been orbiters: Galileo orbited Jupiter for eight years, while Cassini orbited Saturn for thirteen years. Juno has been orbiting Jupiter since 2016.

Summary

Jupiter

 
Six spacecraft have been launched to explore Jupiter, with spacecraft making gravity-assist flybys. 

New Horizons, although eventually targeting Pluto, used Jupiter for a gravity assist and had an extensive almost half year observation campaign of Jupiter and its moons.

Missions whose primary objectives were not related to the exploration of Jupiter are indicated in grey

Saturn

Four spacecraft have visited Saturn; Pioneer 11, Voyager 1 and Voyager 2 made flybys, while Cassini–Huygens entered orbit, and deployed a probe into the atmosphere of Titan.

Uranus

Voyager 2 is the only spacecraft to have visited Uranus, making a single flyby as part of its grand tour of the outer planets.

Neptune

Voyager 2 is also the only spacecraft to have visited Neptune, making a single flyby as part of its grand tour of the outer planets.

See also
List of trans-Neptunian objects (numbered, excludes comets, see Trans-Neptunian object)
List of missions to Venus
List of missions to Mars
Interstellar probe
Kuiper belt (approx. 30-50 AU, Pluto largest of this group)

References

 
 

Outer planets
Missions to the planets
Missions to the outer planets